Fulham Library is a Grade II listed building at 598 Fulham Road, Fulham, London. It was built in 1908, and the architect was Henry Hare. A library has existed on the site since at least 1894.

Among the staff was Edward Dudley, winner of the Chartered Institute of Library and Information Professionals first Cilip medal, who worked there as a librarian from 1936 to 1939.

References

External links

Fulham
Grade II listed library buildings
Grade II listed buildings in the London Borough of Hammersmith and Fulham
Library buildings completed in 1908
Buildings by Henry Hare
1908 establishments in England